The National Artist is a title given annually by the Office of the National Culture Commission of Thailand, recognizing notable Thai artists in the area of intangible cultural heritage such as literature, fine arts, visual arts, applied arts (architecture, design) and performing arts (Thai dance, international dance, puppetry, shadow play, Thai music, international music, drama and film).

Since 1985, the honors have been presented on 24 February, "National Artist Day", in Thailand. The date was chosen because it is the birthdate of Buddha Loetla Nabhalai, or King Rama II, who was an artist himself. In 1986, King Bhumibol Adulyadej, an accomplished musician, photographer, and painter, was named "Supreme Artist".

National artists receive 25,000 baht monthly for life unless the award is retracted. They are also entitled to health insurance, emergency payments, funeral costs, and a stipend of 150,000 baht for writing a biography or autobiography.

The pieces of work perceived of being on the highest level are exhibited in the Supreme Artist Hall.

List of Thailand National Artists

1980s

1990s

2000s

2010s

See also
 Cinema of Thailand
 Culture of Thailand
 Dance of Thailand
 Music of Thailand
 S.E.A. Write Award
 Silpathorn Award

References

External links
 Official website 

 
Lists of Thai people
Thai awards
Awards established in 1985
1985 establishments in Thailand
Thailand